Mark Bugden (born 8 December 1961), nicknamed "Buggo", is an Australian former professional rugby league footballer who primarily played as a .

Background
Bugden was born in Newtown, New South Wales and was a Newtown junior with the Marrickville junior club.

Playing career
The teams he played for at a club level were: the Newtown Jets (1981−83), the Canterbury-Bankstown Bulldogs (1984−85, 1986−88), and the Parramatta Eels (1985, 1989−90). He was a fresh reserve for the Bulldogs in their 24–12 win over the Balmain Tigers in the 1988 Grand Final under the coaching of Phil Gould.

Bugden is the younger brother of former Newtown and Parramatta player and New South Wales front row forward Geoff Bugden.

References

External links
Bulldogs profile

1961 births
Living people
Australian rugby league players
Canterbury-Bankstown Bulldogs players
Parramatta Eels players
Newtown Jets players
Rugby league hookers
Rugby league players from Sydney